Navina Omilade (born 3 November 1981) is a retired German football midfielder of Nigerian descent. She has also been capped for the German national team.

She ended her career in 2013.

Honours

Germany
UEFA Women's Championship: Winner 2005

References

External links
DFB profile

1981 births
Living people
German women's footballers
Germany women's international footballers
1. FFC Turbine Potsdam players
Footballers at the 2004 Summer Olympics
Olympic bronze medalists for Germany
Sportspeople from Mönchengladbach
German sportspeople of Nigerian descent
VfL Wolfsburg (women) players
Olympic medalists in football
Medalists at the 2004 Summer Olympics
Olympic footballers of Germany
UEFA Women's Championship-winning players
Women's association football midfielders
Footballers from North Rhine-Westphalia